Richard Green (1803–1863) was an English shipowner and philanthropist.

Biography 
Green was born at Blackwall in December 1803, the son of George Green, by his first marriage with Miss Perry, daughter of a shipbuilder of repute at Blackwall. On the introduction of the elder Green into Perry's business, he became a shipowner and fitted out a number of vessels in the whaling trade, thus laying the foundation of the house which at the time of his son's admission to the firm was styled Green, Wigram, & Green. Increasing their operations the partners took advantage of the East India Company's charter to build East Indiamen, for which they became well known.

On the death of the head of the firm and the consequent dissolution of partnership, Richard Green continued the business in conjunction with his then surviving brother Henry. Trading as R. & H. Green & Co Ltd., Blackwall, London, sailing as Green's Blackwall line. Green increased the number of vessels until the discovery of gold in Australia, when he and his brother launched a large number of ships for this voyage also. To this service they were about to add another to China, one vessel having made the voyage just before Green's death, and a second being then near completion.

Green devoted much care to the improvement of the mercantile marine. The establishment of the Sailors' Home was one of his earliest efforts. In connection with it, he provided a course of instruction in navigation for officers and men. He was the principal supporter of schools at Poplar, at which two thousand children were taught and partially clothed. To the Merchant Seamen's Orphan Asylum, the Dreadnought Hospital, the Poplar Hospital, and many other charities he was a great benefactor. Green was affectionately regarded in East London. He warmly interested himself in the naval reserve, and was chairman of the committee and a chief mover in the establishment of the Thames Nautical Training College HMS Worcester new pre-sea training ship for officers in the mercantile marine. His favourite saying was that "he had no time to hesitate", and he was noteworthy for his unfailing promptitude, quick decision, clear judgment, and great business acumen. He died near Regent's Park on 17 Jan. 1863, and his funeral at Trinity Independent Chapel, Poplar (founded by his father), was attended by an immense concourse. Green left by his will a large number of charitable bequests, including a free gift of the building and a perpetual endowment of his Sailors' Home at Poplar.

Statue 

A statue by Edward William Wyon (1811–1885), of Green stands outside the Poplar Baths, his face modeled from his death mask; with him is his faithful Newfoundland dog "Hector". The dog famously lost its ear in 1967 when a young boy got stuck climbing the statue, and the Fire Services had to cut him away. On the side of the statue there are two Bas reliefs, to commemorate his shipbuilding exploits; on one side is the Arapiles which was still under construction in his shipyard on his death, and on the other side the record-breaking Clipper Challenger which he built in 1852 to challenge American rivals in the tea trade.

References

External links 

 Richard Green at Grace's Guide

1803 births
1863 deaths
Philanthropists from London
People from the London Borough of Tower Hamlets
19th-century British philanthropists
Businesspeople from London
19th-century English businesspeople